Haji Muhammad Yousaf Trand  یوسف خان ترند is a Pakistani politician who has been a member of the provincial assembly of nwfp kpk, since  1977  1985 1988  1990 1993 1997. Previously he was a member of the provincial Assembly  NWFP from 1997 to 1999.

Political career
He ran for the seat of the provincial assembly of NWFP from Constituency PF 48 (Mansehra vi )  haji yousaf khan trand  vote 9570 provincial assembly seat for the first time in 1977, defeating ex Parliamentary Secretary Mr Malang vote 6717

He was re elected to the provincial assembly NWFP from Constituency PF 48  Mansehra  vi  as a Non Party Election  1985  he received 9713 votes and defeated  9713  Muhammad fayaz khan 5923

he was  re elected  to the provincial assembly NWFP from Constituency PF 47  Mansehra  vi  as a Candidate IJI   1988 election he received 6082  votes and defeated  Haji Atta Muhammad Khan 5049  haji yousaf khan has also been a minister in Sherpao's cabinet

he was re elected to the provincial assembly NWFP from Constituency PF 47 Mansehra he as an Independent candidate 1990 election he recivied vote 7420   and defeated Mr Malang Khan 4796

Yousuf Khan Tarand also ran a strong opposition against Pir Sabir Shah Pir Sabir Shah offered him the ministry several times but he did not accept it and remained in the opposition against him

he was re elected to the provincial assembly NWFP from Constituency PF 48 Mansehra he as an candidate of PML J 1993  election he recivied vote 10238 and defeated Muhammad Ayaz Khan 8306

Yousaf Khan was once again given an important ministry in the provincial cabinet

And they helped run the House well by forming the Sherpao Group

he was re elected to the provincial assembly NWFP from Constituency PF 48 Mansehra 1997 Election  he as an Participated in the election as an independent  candidate  he received 8548 vote and  he defeating  Muhammad ayaz khan 7582 And set an unbeaten record in provincial assemble NWFP

Seeing his good performance, Sardar Mehtab invited him to join his cabinet

Haji Yusuf Khan formed his own group within the assembly which was named Seven Star And for the fourth time he was again included in the provincial cabinet

as a candidate of Pakistan Muslim inLeague (Q) (PML-Q) in Pakistani general election, 2002 but was unsuccessful. He received 10,875 votes and lost the seat to Qari Muhammad Yousuf.

He was elected to the National Assembly from Constituency NA-22 (Battagram) as a candidate of PML-Q in Pakistani general election, 2008. He received 22,316 votes and defeated Qari Muhammad Yousuf.

He ran for the seat of the National Assembly from Constituency NA-22 (Battagram) as an independent candidate in Pakistani general election, 2013 but was unsuccessful. He received 53 votes and lost the seat to Qari Muhammad Yousuf.

He was re-elected to the National Assembly as a candidate of Pakistan Tehreek-e-Insaf (PTI) from Constituency NA-12 (Battagram) in Pakistani general election, 2018. He received 34,270 votes and defeated Qari Muhammad Yousuf.

References

Pakistani MNAs 2008–2013
Living people
People from Battagram District
Swati
Pakistani MNAs 2018–2023
Year of birth missing (living people)